Dripping Springs Park is located in Okmulgee County, Oklahoma, near the city of Okmulgee, Oklahoma.

Recreational opportunities at Dripping Springs Park include RV camping, tent camping, swimming, fishing, and boating. Facilities offered include group pavilions, grills, picnic areas, showers, lighted boat ramp, fishing dock, and an ADA comfort station. RV sites include electric, water, and sewer service. Water skiing is not allowed.

Dripping Springs Lake 
Dripping Springs Lake was designated as Oklahoma's first trophy bass lake. The park is adjacent to Okmulgee Park and Okmulgee Lake.

Construction began in 1976, but the lake was not completely filled until 1979. The Oklahoma Water Resources Board reported that the lake becomes thermally stratified during summer and does not support the dissolved oxygen (DO) requirements set by the state Fish and Wildlife Propagation Program. However, ODWC also reported that water clarity was excellent, compared to other state lakes, and that it was neutral to slightly alkaline (pH 6.68-7.82).

References

See also
 Okmulgee Park

Protected areas of Okmulgee County, Oklahoma
Lakes of Oklahoma
Bodies of water of Okmulgee County, Oklahoma